The New Hampshire Wildcats Basketball team is the basketball team that represent the University of New Hampshire in Durham, New Hampshire. The school's team currently competes in the America East Conference and plays its home games at Lundholm Gym. The Wildcats are one of 45 Division I programs to have never appeared in the NCAA Division I men's basketball tournament. They currently coached by Bill Herrion.

Team history

Awards
America East Coach of the Year
 Gerry Friel – 1983

America East Rookie of the Year
 Al McLain – 1981
 Pat Manor – 1990
 Tanner Leissner – 2015

All-Conference First Team
 Robin Dixon – 1983
 Al McLain – 1984
 Scott Drapeau – 1994, 1995
 Chris Brown – 2002
 Blagov Janev – 2006
 Tanner Leissner – 2015

All-Conference Second Team
 Dan Nolan – 1984
 Dirk Koopman – 1986
 James Ben – 1992
 Eric Montanari – 1994
 Matt Alosa – 1995, 1996
 Austin Ganly – 2002
 Ben Sturgill – 2005
 Blagov Janev – 2007
 Tyrece Gibbs – 2009
 Alvin Abreu – 2010

All-Conference Third Team
 Jermaine Anderson – 2007
 Tyrece Gibbs – 2008

All-Conference Defensive Team
 Jermaine Anderson – 2007

Coaches

Season-by-season results

All-Time Conference Record: 278–648 (.300)All-Time Overall Record: 911–1310 (.410)

Postseason

CIT results
New Hampshire has appeared in the CollegeInsider.com Postseason Tournament (CIT) twice. The Wildcats have a record of 1–2.

Records

All-time leaders

Points

Assists

Rebounds

References

External links
 Official website